Christiana Jade de Silva-Ong (born August 1, 1987) is a Filipino art director, painter, illustrator and graphic designer. She was known as a "Gifted Child" and a "Promil Kid", being featured in an infant formula ad in 1998. She had three major one-woman exhibits and now a senior art director.

Background
De Silva was born in Manila and was raised in the city of Malabon. She studied high school in St. Scholastica's College Manila. And in 2008, she graduated magna cum laude from the University of the Philippines Diliman College of Fine Arts, with a degree in Visual Communication.

Work

Exhibits
De Silva had three major one-woman exhibits and participated in many group art shows through the years.
 Cj de Silva: The First Solo Exhibit (1998) - The Ayala Museum, Makati
 Cj de Silva: The Year After (1999) - The Ayala Museum, Makati
 Gift for the Gifted (2003) - Philam Life Theater Lobby, Manila City
 stART with Mio (2009), A Benefit Exhibit - Gallery 7, Eastwood
 8 Clinique: You Are a Work of Art (2012) -  Whitespace Gallery, Makati 
 16x16 Young Star Philippines' 16th Anniversary Exhibit (2012) - Rockwell Powerplant Mall, Makati
 Bloom Arts Festival (2012) - Cubao X, Cubao, Quezon City
 Bloom Arts Festival (2013) - The Collective, Makati

Illustration and Graphic Design
Cj de Silva has illustrated the 2006 First Prize awardee in the Carlos Palanca Memorial Awards for Literature, Ang Ikaklit sa Aming Hardin, written by Bernadette Villanueva Neri. She has also designed and illustrated the album art of itchyworms' fifth studio album After All This Time. de Silva has also illustrated some fictional gig posters as part of the marketing campaign for Quark Henares' film Rakenrol. Cj de Silva's illustrations were also featured in Esquire Philippines. She is also known for painting and illustrating on sneakers and became one of Keds Philippines ambassadors.

Advertising
Right after graduating from college, de Silva started working in TBWA-Santiago Mangada Puno. Being part of the Creative team, she has won a few advertising awards. She was part of the team that won the Philippines' first Webby Award for the internet film entitled "A Toy Love Story That Will Make You Cry".

Personal life
In 2013, de Silva married director Wincy Aquino Ong.

References 

1987 births
Living people
Advertising people
Filipino artists
University of the Philippines Diliman alumni
People from Manila
People from Malabon
Artists from Metro Manila